Indiana and Michigan Avenues Historic District is a national historic district located at LaPorte, LaPorte County, Indiana.  The district encompasses 223 contributing buildings and one contributing site in a predominantly residential section of LaPorte.  It developed between about 1860 and 1963, and includes examples of Italianate, Queen Anne, Colonial Revival, Prairie School, and Bungalow / American Craftsman style architecture.  Located in the district is the separately listed Francis H. Morrison House.  Other notable buildings include the Hobart M. Cable, Jr., House (c. 1925), Rear Admiral R. R. Ingersoll Residence (1908), John Secor House (c. 1890), Swan-Anderson House (1870), Carnegie Library (1920), Emmett Scott House (1915), Frank Osborn House (c. 1895), Henry McGill House (c. 1863, 1881), First Presbyterian Church (1862), Winn House (c. 1875), First Church of Christ Scientist (c 1890, 1920), and St. Paul's Episcopal Church (1895-1898).

It was listed in the National Register of Historic Places in 2014.

References

Historic districts on the National Register of Historic Places in Indiana
Houses on the National Register of Historic Places in Indiana
Italianate architecture in Indiana
Prairie School architecture in Indiana
Queen Anne architecture in Indiana
Colonial Revival architecture in Indiana
Historic districts in LaPorte County, Indiana
National Register of Historic Places in LaPorte County, Indiana